Kolhabi (Nepali: कोल्हवी ) is a municipality in Bara District in Province No. 2 of Nepal. It was formed in 2016 occupying current 11 sections (wards) from previous 11 former VDCs. It occupies an area of 157.4 km2 with a total population of 43,036.

References

Populated places in Bara District
Nepal municipalities established in 2014
Municipalities in Madhesh Province